Grona is a genus in the flowering plant family Fabaceae. Its native range is worldwide tropics and subtropics.

Taxonomy 
The genus is placed in subfamily Faboideae and tribe Desmodieae. It was previously included in its relative Desmodium.

There are about 44 species in the genus:

References 

 
Taxa described in 1790
Taxa named by João de Loureiro
Fabaceae genera